Kataouane is a town in south-eastern Mauritania. It is located in the Bassikounou Department in the Hodh Ech Chargui region .

External links
Satellite map at Maplandia.com

Populated places in Mauritania
Hodh Ech Chargui Region